Willie McClinton Jr.  (born  January 5, 1987) is an American professional wrestler better known by his ring name Willie Mack, currently appearing in Lucha Libre AAA Worldwide and Major League Wrestling (MLW). He is best known for his tenure with Impact Wrestling, where he is a former Impact X Division Champion.

Mack spent the first years of his career working in the independent circuit, usually in California-based promotions like Pro Wrestling Guerrilla and Championship Wrestling from Hollywood. He had his first national exposure in 2015, when he signed with the El Rey Network show Lucha Underground, a pro wrestling series created by Mexican promotion Lucha Libre AAA Worldwide. He worked until 2018 as The Mack and won the Lucha Underground Trios Championship two times. After Lucha Underground ended, he worked in the National Wrestling Alliance, where he is a former NWA National Heavyweight Champion, but he left the promotion after signing a contract with AAA partner Impact Wrestling.

Professional wrestling career

Independent circuit (2006–present)
Mack began his wrestling training while still in high school, but put it on hold until he graduated. He then attended Martin Marin's WPW Training School in Anaheim, California and wrestled at their weekly events at the Anaheim Marketplace. Knowing that he needed further training, Mack moved on to Bart Kapitzke's AWS School in Industry, California and began wrestling for the National Wrestling Alliance (NWA) sanctioned Alternative Wrestling Show.

At AWS, he was noticed by NWA producers and was invited to appear at tapings of NWA Wrestling Showcase, where he had the opportunity to face such wrestlers as Adam Pearce, Brent Albright, Joey Ryan, Chris Escobar and more. Mack also wrestled at the tapings as part of a tag team with his best friend and fellow WPW graduate Jerome Robinson.

Mack began wrestling for another NWA sanctioned group, Mach One Wrestling, who run weekly events at the American Sports Center across the street from where WPW had run previously. Mack was instantly one of the most popular wrestlers in the group. On February 5, 2010 after defeating Scorpio Sky in a number one contenders match for the M1W Championship, Mack entered himself into a three-way elimination match later that same evening, making it a four-way. After Joey Ryan and James Morgan were eliminated, Mack defeated reigning champion, Bobby Marshall to claim the title.

On March 5, 2011, Mack lost the M1W Championship to Morgan in a four-way match that also involved Nick Madrid and Andrew Hellman. On November 2, 2013, Mack participated in a tournament to crown the first MexPro Wrestling United States Champion. He defeated Jacob Diez and SoCal Crazy in the semi-finals, but he lost to CJ Kruz in the finale. On November 3, 2013, Mack was defeated by Samoa Joe at Championship Wrestling from Hollywood's Open Door, in a Dream match. On November 14, 2013, Mack was defeated by the CWFH Santino Bros. Wrestling Champion Robby Phoenix. On June 15, 2014 Mack won the Championship Wrestling from Hollywood Red Carpet Rumble in a match which included Matt Striker, X-Pac, Jake "The Snake" Roberts and Joey Ryan.

Pro Wrestling Guerrilla (2010–2014)
Mack debuted for the Southern California company Pro Wrestling Guerrilla on December 11, 2010, winning his first match. It has been acknowledged on DVD commentary that he attended PWG shows as a fan before training to be a wrestler. On March 4, 2011, Mack participated in the 2011 Dynamite Duumvirate Tag Team Title Tournament, pairing with Brandon Gatson in a loss against The Young Bucks (Matt and Nick Jackson), the eventual winners, in the Opening Round. On May 27, Mack gained a substantial win by upsetting Kevin Steen. He then began a streak of wrestling top names on the independent scene, defeating Chris Hero in the first round of the 2011 Battle of Los Angeles before losing to El Generico, the eventual winner, in the Semifinal Round. On December 10, Mack beat Chris Hero for a second time in what ended up being Hero's PWG exit match. He continued his streak by beating Naruki Doi on January 29 and Roderick Strong on March 17, 2012.

Mack took part in the 2012 Dynamite Duumvirate Tag Team Title Tournament, teaming with El Generico as 2 Husky Black Guys. The duo beat Roderick Strong and the debuting Sami Callihan in the Opening and the RockNES Monsters (Johnny Goodtime and Johnny Yuma) in the Semifinal Rounds, before succumbing to the Super Smash Bros. (Player Uno and Stupefied) in the Final. On May 25, Mack faced and beat debutant Michael Elgin. On July 21 at Threemendous III, PWG's nine-year anniversary event, Mack received a shot at the PWG World Championship, but was defeated by defending champion Kevin Steen. The match saw an interference by Brian Cage, which launched a feud between Cage and Mack. The 2012 Battle of Los Angeles, taking place in September, saw Mack lose against Sami Callihan on Night One. The following month at Failure to Communicate, Mack lost in his first encounter against Brian Cage. At Mystery Vortex on December 1, he faced Cage once more, this time in a match also involving B-Boy and T. J. Perkins, with Mack emerging victorious. Mack wrestled his PWG farewell match on August 31, 2014.

WWE signing (2014)
In September 2014, it was reported that McClinton had passed WWE's medical tests and would be reporting to WWE's developmental territory, NXT, in Orlando, Florida. He had been signed to the promotion for a few months at this point. However, only a month later on October 13, 2014, McClinton stated that he had been released from WWE before he had even arrived in Orlando. A few years later, McClinton said WWE fired him because a medical test found something wrong with his blood pressure and his knee; however, he suspects he was fired because WWE signed another African American wrestler at the same time that had a better body than him.

Lucha Underground (2015–2018)

In February 2015, it was announced Mack worked at Lucha Underground's TV Tapings. He wrestled under the ringname The Mack, Big Ryck's cousin. On February 8, 2015, along with Killshot and Big Ryck participated in a tournament for the LU Trios Championship, but they were defeated in the semi-finals by the eventual winners Angélico, Son of Havoc and Ivelisse.  Mack was then put into a feud with Cage, who attacked Mack backstage in order to be a part of a trios team with Big Ryck and Davari.  Their feud culminated in a falls count anywhere match that saw Mack lose to Cage. On the first set of tapings for season 2 of Lucha Underground Mack defeated the debuting PJ Black using the stunner. Mack was unsuccessful at winning the Lucha Underground Championship against Johnny Mundo in a Falls Count Anywhere match. Mack would team with A. R. Fox and Killshot as they defeated Snake Tribe (Drago, Pindar and Vibora) to win the Lucha Underground Trios Championship. During the season 4, Fox was replaced by Son of Havoc as champion, starting a feud with Killshot. The trio would lose the title against The Reptile Tribe. The serie was discontinued after season finale, Ultima Lucha Cuatro.

Impact Wrestling

Teaming with Rich Swann (2018–2020) 
Mack debuted for Impact Wrestling on the October 11 episode of Impact!, where Rich Swann announced that Willie would be his tag team partner for his match at Bound for Glory, where the new duo would face Matt Sydal and Ethan Page. The team went on to emerge victorious at Bound for Glory. Shortly thereafter Mack began appearing regularly on Impact programming and frequently teamed with Swann. On the December 6 episode of Impact!, Mack lost an Ultimate X qualifying match against Jake Crist after a distraction by Crist's oVe leader Sami Callihan, which resulted in Mack beginning a feud with oVe. Mack lost a match to Callihan at Homecoming but defeated Callihan in a rematch on the January 11, 2019 episode of Impact!. Mack would frequently team with Swann as well as Tommy Dreamer and Fallah Bahh against oVe throughout the first quarter of 2019. He also picked up a major win against Ethan Page at Uncaged.

In May, Mack entered a brief feud with the newcomer Michael Elgin, which led to him losing to Elgin at Code Red and the June 14 episode of Impact!. Mack continued to feud with oVe as he teamed with Swann and Tessa Blanchard to defeat oVe members Dave Crist, Jake Crist and Madman Fulton in a six-person tag team match at Bash at the Brewery. At Slammiversary XVII, Mack defeated Jake Crist, TJP and Trey in a four-way match. Mack then entered the Mashup Tournament to determine the #1 contender for the Impact World Championship on the July 19 episode of Impact!, where he was randomly paired with Michael Elgin and they defeated the team of Ace Austin and Stone Rockwell to qualify for the four-way elimination match in the tournament final where they were eliminated by the eventual winners Sami Callihan and Tessa Blanchard after Elgin turned on Mack.

Swann and Mack would then begin pursuing the World Tag Team Championship and entered a lengthy rivalry against the champions The North for the titles. They first challenged North for the titles in a three-way match, also involving Reno Scum at Unbreakable, but failed to win the titles. Swann and Mack received another title shot against North in a three-way match, also involving Rhino and Rob Van Dam in a three-way match at Bound for Glory but lost again. Swann and Mack would then unsuccessfully challenge North for the titles at Turning Point. They received another title shot against North at Hard to Kill but Swann suffered an ankle injury which rendered him unable to compete and Mack challenged North for the titles in a handicap match which he lost.

X Division Champion (2020–2022) 
On the February 11, 2020 episode of Impact!, Mack and Johnny Swinger lost a match to Desi Hit Squad members Mahabali Shera and Rohit Raju, which led to a post-match confrontation between the two and Mack briefly feuded with Swinger, which led to Mack defeating Swinger in subsequent matches. On the March 24 episode of Impact!, Mack won an eight-way match to become the #1 contender for the X Division Championship. He received his title shot against Ace Austin at Rebellion. Mack defeated Austin to win the X Division Championship, his first title in Impact Wrestling. In his first title defense, Mack successfully defended the title against Austin and Chris Bey in a three-way match on the May 5 episode of Impact Wrestling. Mack then retained the title against Johnny Swinger on the May 19 episode of Impact!. On July 7, 2020 Mack retained the title against Swinger-Cide (Johnny Swinger dressed as Suicide). On July 18, at Slammiversary, Mack lost the championship to Chris Bey.

He then began a feud against Brian Myers. At Emergence Night Two, he was defeated by Myers and successively lost the feud. At Victory Road, Mack defeated the X-Division Champion Rohit Raju by countout. At Bound for Glory, Mack competed in a Six-way Intergender Scramble match for the Impact X Division Championship which was won by Rohit Raju. At Turning Point, Mack defeated Moose by disqualification in match for the unsanctioned TNA World Heavyweight Championship. At Genesis, Mack defeated Moose in a "I Quit" Match.

On May 6, 2022, Mack announced his departure from the company.

National Wrestling Alliance (2018–2019) 
Mack begun to wrestle for the official reborn National Wrestling Alliance (NWA) promotion under Billy Corgan. He had returned to wrestling for Championship Wrestling From Hollywood, which the NWA has had a working relationship with since February 2018. Mack was named as the first challenger for the NWA Worlds Heavyweight Champion Cody Rhodes. Their match took place at the Ring of Honor (ROH) Death Before Dishonor XVI event on September 28, 2018, where he was defeated by Cody. At the NWA 70th Anniversary Show on October 21, 2018, Mack defeated Sam Shaw to win the vacant NWA National Heavyweight Championship. Both Mack and Shaw had won separate four-way elimination matches earlier in the card to qualify for the chance to win this title. At the 2019 Crockett Cup, Mack lost the title to Colt Cabana.

Personal life

Willie Mack has been in a relationship with his current girlfriend since 2013. They both reside in Las Vegas, NV.

Championships and accomplishments

 Alternative Wrestling Show
AWS Heavyweight Championship (1 time)
Championship Wrestling from Hollywood
CWFH Heritage Heavyweight Championship (1 time)
CWFH International Television Championship (1 time)
Red Carpet Rumble (2014)
The Crash Lucha Libre
The Crash Heavyweight Championship (1 time)
Copa The Crash (2016)
Elite Xtreme Wrestling
EXW Elite Division Championship (1 time)
 House of Hardcore
 HOH Twitch Television Championship (1 time, current)
 HOH Twitch TV Title Tournament (2018)
Impact Wrestling
Impact X Division Championship (1 time)
Impact Year End Awards (1 time)
One to Watch in 2020	(2019)
Insane Wrestling League
IWL Anarchy Championship (1 time)
IWL Anarchy Championship Tournament (2009)
Lucha Underground
Lucha Underground Trios Championship (2 times) – with A. R. Fox and Killshot (1) and Killshot and Son of Havoc (1)
Battle of the Bulls Tournament
Mach One Wrestling
M1W Heavyweight Championship (1 time)
National Wrestling Alliance
NWA National Championship (1 time)
Pro Wrestling Illustrated
 Ranked No. 68 of the top 500 singles wrestlers in the PWI 500 in 2020
Rival Pro Wrestling
RPW Undisputed Championship (1 time)
SoCal Uncensored
Southern California Wrestler of the Year (2010)
World Power Wrestling
WPW Heavyweight Championship (1 time)

Footnotes

External links
 Willie Mack's Impact Wrestling profile

Willie Mack on Facebook

1987 births
American male professional wrestlers
African-American male professional wrestlers
Living people
Sportspeople from Los Angeles
Professional wrestlers from California
21st-century African-American sportspeople
20th-century African-American people
TNA/Impact X Division Champions
Lucha Underground Trios Champions
NWA National Heavyweight Champions